The SS Belgian was a 5,287-ton steamship which was built in 1919, sold in 1934 becoming Amelia Lauro, seized in 1940 and renamed Empire Activity and wrecked in 1943.

History
Belgian was built by Swan Hunter and Wigham Richardson Ltd, Wallsend and launched on 29 August 1919, being completed in October 1919.  From 1919 to 1934 Belgian was owned by the Leyland Line. In 1934, she was sold to Achille Lauro, and renamed Amelia Lauro.

On 7 March 1940, Amelia Lauro was damaged by German bombing at  en route from Newcastle upon Tyne to Piombino laden with coal. She was set on fire and the crew anchored her, then abandoned her. The SS Titania rescued 37 of the crew, and the sloops Pintail and Londonderry assisted. Amelia Lauro was escorted to Immingham with her superstructure burnt out. One crew member was killed outright and three were wounded. One of the wounded crewmen later died from his injuries. In an expression of gratitude, Lauro Lines owner Achille Lauro donated £26. 5s to the Royal National Lifeboat Institution in appreciation of assistance rendered by the Great Yarmouth and Gorleston lifeboat in bringing 29 crew to shore. Permission was given for temporary repairs to be carried out.

As a consequence of Italy's declaration of war on 10 June 1940, Amelia Lauro was seized as a prize of war. The seizure was ratified by the prize court on 4 May 1941. Amelia Lauro was taken over by the Ministry of War Transport, being renamed Empire Activity. Galbraith, Pembroke & Co were appointed managers. She was en route from Botwood to the United Kingdom laden with zinc concentrates.

Official Number and code letters
Official Numbers were a forerunner to IMO Numbers.

Belgian had the UK Official Number 140659. Amelia Lauro had the Italian Official Number 423 Empire Activity had the UK Official Number 140659.

Belgian used the Code Letters KCQH. Amelia Lauro used the Code Letters IBEZ. Empire Activity used the Code Letters GQXX.

References

External links
Photo of Empire Activity

1919 ships
Standard World War I ships
Ships built on the River Tyne
Steamships of Italy
World War II merchant ships of Italy
Steamships of the United Kingdom
Ministry of War Transport ships
Shipwrecks of the Newfoundland and Labrador coast
World War II shipwrecks in the Atlantic Ocean
Maritime incidents in October 1943
Ships built by Swan Hunter